Édouard Martin, full name Édouard Joseph Martin, (19 July 1825  – 13 July 1866 ) was a 19th-century French playwright.

When he was a young dramatist and a friend of Edmond About and Théophile Gautier,  Édouard Martin was known for the comedies he wrote in collaboration with Eugène Labiche, Albert Monnier and Paul Siraudin, during the Second French Empire.

Suffering from mental illness in 1864, he died at the municipal nursing home Dubois (today ) 13 July 1866. At his burial at Saint-Denis on 14 July, it was Léon Gozlan who delivered his eulogy.

Works 
1853: Collégiens, étudiants et mercadets pour rire
1855: Sous un parapluie, with Albert Monnier and Paul Siraudin
1859: Madame Absalon, with Paul Siraudin
1860: Jeune de cœur, with Émile de Najac
1863: La Fleur des braves, withavec Ernest Mouchelet

Plays written in collaboration with Labiche and/or Monnier

1852: L'Argent par les fenêtres
1852: Le Droit de visite
1855: Un oncle aux carottes
1856: As-tu tué le mandarin ?
1857: L'Affaire de la rue de Lourcine
1857: Les Noces de Bouchencœur
1858: Chez une petite dame
1859: L'Amour, un fort volume, prix 3 F 50 c
1859: Les Petites Mains
1860: Le Voyage de monsieur Perrichon
1860: Le Pantalon de Nessus
1861: Les Vivacités du capitaine Tic
1861: La Poudre aux yeux
1862: Le Bataillon de la Moselle
1862: Les 37 Sous de M. Montaudoin
1863: La Commode de Victorine
1864: Moi
1864: Les Truffes
1864: Le Petit de la rue du Ponceau
1865: Histoire d'une patrouille
1867: La Main leste

References 

19th-century French dramatists and playwrights
1825 births
People from Melun
1866 deaths